The 1986 AFC U-16 Championship was the 2nd edition of the AFC U-16 Championship organised by the Asian Football Confederation (AFC). It also served as a qualification tournament for the 1987 FIFA U-16 World Championship to be held at Canada. South Korea won the tournament, and qualified for the 1987 U-16 World Cup along runners-up Qatar and third-placed Saudi Arabia.

Qualification

Qualified teams:
 (host)
 (Group 1 winner)
 (Group 2 winner)
 (Group 3 winner)
 (Group 4 winner)
 (Group 5 winner)
 (Group 6 winner)
 (Group 7 winner)

Group stage

Group A

Group B

Konckout stage

Semifinals

Third place match

Final

Winners

Tournament ranking

Teams qualified for 1987 FIFA U-16 World Championship

External links
rsssf.com

Under
International association football competitions hosted by Qatar
1986–87 in Qatari football
1986 in youth association football
AFC U-16 Championships